The Midland Railway 1121 class was a class of 0-6-0T tank locomotives designed by Samuel W. Johnson for the Midland Railway. Fifty-five were built between 1895 and 1900: ten by the railway company's Derby Works, five by Sharp, Stewart and Company, and the remaining forty by Robert Stephenson and Company.

Construction history
The class were a development of the 1377 class “half cabs”. They differed by having the A1 type boiler in place of the earlier's type A. The wheelbase was stretched by  – all between the main and rear driving wheels. They also had a full cab.

Post-Midland Railway
All 55 passed to the London, Midland and Scottish Railway (LMS) at the 1923 grouping in 1923. Withdrawals started in 1930, and by 1948, when the railways were nationalised, 23 locomotives passed into British Railways ownership, and were allocated numbers 40000 higher than their LMS numbers, although five were withdrawn before the new numbers were applied. Withdrawals continued, with the last one, 41875, taken out of service in July 1963.

None were preserved.

References

1121
0-6-0T locomotives
Railway locomotives introduced in 1895
Standard gauge steam locomotives of Great Britain
Sharp Stewart locomotives
Robert Stephenson and Company locomotives
Scrapped locomotives